El Carmen, El Salvador may refer to:

 El Carmen, Cuscatlán, a municipality in the Cuscatlán department of El Salvador
 El Carmen, La Unión, a municipality in the La Unión department of El Salvador